Gołubie Kaszubskie railway station is a railway station serving the town of Gołubie, in the Pomeranian Voivodeship, Poland. The station is located on the Nowa Wieś Wielka–Gdynia Port railway. The train services are operated by SKM Tricity.

The station also used to lie on the Kościerzyna–Gołubie Kaszubskie railway until its closure in 1930. This line has been dismantled. The station used to be known as Golben under German occupation.

Modernisation
In 2014 the station was modernised.

Train services
The station is served by the following services:
Pomorska Kolej Metropolitalna services (R) Kościerzyna — Gdańsk Port Lotniczy (Airport) — Gdańsk Wrzeszcz — Gdynia Główna
Pomorska Kolej Metropolitalna services (R) Kościerzyna — Gdańsk Osowa — Gdynia Główna

References

Gołubie Kaszubskie article at Polish Stations Database, URL accessed at 6 March 2006
 This article is based upon a translation of the Polish language version as of July 2016.

Railway stations in Pomeranian Voivodeship
Kartuzy County